The Syracuse, Phoenix and Oswego Railroad was chartered on November 29, 1871, and had a route from Woodard, located north of Syracuse, New York, to Fulton, New York, a distance of . They merged with the Syracuse Northwestern Railroad on June 10, 1875, and incorporated as Syracuse, Phoenix and Oswego Railway on February 16, 1885.

In 1889, the railroad line merged with Rome, Watertown and Ogdensburg Railroad until 1913, when the company became part of the New York Central and Hudson River Railroad which was renamed to New York Central Railroad in 1914.

References

Predecessors of the New York Central Railroad
Defunct railroads in Syracuse, New York
Defunct New York (state) railroads
Railway companies established in 1871
Railway companies disestablished in 1889
1871 establishments in New York (state)
1889 disestablishments in New York (state)